Live at Shepherds Bush Empire is a live EP by British indie rock band The Rifles. Released on October 4, 2007 it features recordings from The Rifles' live show at Shepherds Bush Empire in London, England. The EP was produced by Concert Live and limited to 1,000 copies.

Track listing

See also
The Rifles

2007 debut EPs